Survivor is an American reality television show, a derivative of the Swedish program, Expedition Robinson. It is broadcast on CBS and hosted by Jeff Probst.

The first season, Survivor: Borneo, premiered on May 31, 2000 as part of the summer 2000 primetime scheduling cycle, and it has been aired semiannually since 2001. . On March 9, 2022, the series renewed for the forty-third and forty-fourth seasons. The forty-fourth season premiered on March 1, 2023.  

 Series overview

List of episodes

Seasons 1–20 (2000–2010)

Seasons 21–40 (2010–2020)

Seasons 41–present (2021–present)

Specials

References

External links 
 
 

Survivor (American TV series)